The 2018–19 Rugby League European Championship C (also known as Euro C) was the tenth edition of the Rugby League European Championship C and acted as the initial phase of European qualifying to the 2021 Men's Rugby League World Cup. The series involves two pools of three teams in a round-robin tournament.

Fixtures

Group A

Group B

Final
At the draw for the groupings for the 2019 Rugby League European play-off tournament it was announced that the Championship C final will be played in London on 18 May 2019. This match acted as a curtain raiser for a League 1 fixture between the London Skolars and Doncaster, which posted a crowd of 608.''

See also

 International rugby league in 2018
 International rugby league in 2019
 2021 Men's Rugby League World Cup qualification
 2018 Rugby League European Championship
 2018 Rugby League European Championship B

References

European rugby league competitions
2018 in rugby league
2019 in rugby league
2021 Rugby League World Cup